Dane Fischer (born September 21, 1979) is an American basketball coach who is currently the head coach of the William & Mary Tribe men's basketball team.

Playing career
Fischer played college basketball at Ithaca College, where he graduated in the top 10 in career steals and assists while helping guide the Bombers to an NCAA Tournament appearance.

Coaching career
Upon graduation, Fischer entered the coaching ranks, taking an assistant coaching position at Williams College under Dave Paulsen, where the Ephs reached the national championship game of the 2004 NCAA Division III Tournament. In 2005, Fischer headed to the Division I ranks joining the coaching staff at Rider, where he stayed until 2008 before reuniting with Paulsen who had taken the head coaching position at Bucknell. While on staff with the Bison, Fischer was part of two NCAA Tournament squads and four Patriot League regular season championship teams. In 2015, Fischer followed Paulsen to George Mason to serve as assistant coach.

On April 2, 2019, Fischer was named the 31st head men's basketball coach in William & Mary history, replacing Tony Shaver.

Head coaching record

References

1979 births
Living people
American men's basketball coaches
American men's basketball players
Basketball coaches from Minnesota
Basketball players from Minnesota
Bucknell Bison men's basketball coaches
College men's basketball head coaches in the United States
George Mason Patriots men's basketball coaches
Ithaca Bombers men's basketball players
Rider Broncs men's basketball coaches
Sportspeople from Rochester, Minnesota
William & Mary Tribe men's basketball coaches
Williams Ephs men's basketball coaches